Union Schoolhouse is located in Middletown Township, Monmouth County, New Jersey, United States. The schoolhouse was built in 1842 and added to the National Register of Historic Places on June 23, 1976.

See also
National Register of Historic Places listings in Monmouth County, New Jersey

References

Buildings and structures in Monmouth County, New Jersey
National Register of Historic Places in Monmouth County, New Jersey
Middletown Township, New Jersey
School buildings completed in 1842
School buildings on the National Register of Historic Places in New Jersey
New Jersey Register of Historic Places